Eka Ghazadze (born February 13, 1979) is Georgian financier, who has served as Deputy Auditor General of Georgia since October 2017.

Working Experience 
Georgian Stock Exchange (GSE) Chief Financial Officer and Chief Operating Officer (2017); DCFTA External Communication Strategy — Investment Expert (2016); Tbilisi Silk Road Forum — Project Coordinator, Consultant, Asian Development Bank (2015); JSC Bank of Georgia (later JSC Galt &Taggart), Georgia) — Head of Research Department (2015-2012); Renaissance Capital — Kazakhstan and UK — Equity Research Analyst (2012-2007); European Bank for Reconstruction and Development — Associate Banker, UK Head Office (2006-2007), 9-month rotation, Financial Analyst — (2002-2006); International Monetary Fund — Assistant to IMF Advisor to the Ministry of Finance of Georgia (2001-2002); State Department for Statistics of Georgia — Acting Head, Balance of Payments Division  (2000-2001).

Education
MSc in Investment Management (Scholarship from British Petroleum/British Council) Cass Business School, City University of London (2006-2007) Master of International Economic Relations; Technical University of Georgia (2001-2003).
 
Besides native Georgian, speaks English and Russian languages.

References

External links
Biography at State Audit Office website

1979 births
Living people
Businesspeople from Tbilisi
Economists from Georgia (country)